The Salute to the Oil Industry NAPA Auto Parts 150 is an ARCA Menards Series West race held at the Kern County Raceway Park in Irwindale, California. The race has varied from 63 miles to 88 miles, and currently sits at 75.

Past winners

 2014, 2017, 2019: Race extended due to a Green–white–checker finish.

References

External links
 

Motorsport in California
Recurring sporting events established in 2013
ARCA Menards Series West